Newly qualified teacher (NQT) is a category of teacher in the United Kingdom. Newly qualified teachers are those who have gained Qualified Teacher Status but have not yet completed the statutory twelve-month programme known as the "induction for newly qualified teachers".

Qualified teachers are not permitted to work permanently in state-maintained schools unless they have completed or are completing the induction for newly qualified teachers. They are, however, permitted to perform supply work in state-maintained schools for the first five years after gaining Qualified Teacher Status. This has led to the misconception that the NQT induction year must be completed within five years of gaining QTS; there is in fact no statutory time-scale within which a teacher must complete the NQT induction, but after five years they will be unable to do supply work in state-maintained schools.

Origins
The term began to be used in the mid-1990s following the removal of the requirement for teachers to serve a probationary period in 1991 under the Education (Teachers) (Amendment) Regulations 1992. Until that time, teachers who had recently qualified were more commonly known as probationary teachers, or probationers.

This gradual change was cemented by the introduction of an induction period for teaching in 1999, under the Education (Induction Arrangements for School Teachers) (England) Regulations 1999. These regulations made it a requirement that all teachers complete an induction period equivalent to one year upon qualification as a teacher.

Use
Although the only definition in legislation refers to a period of twelve months, the term is commonly used to refer to a teacher who has not yet completed a period of induction. While for teachers who are employed full-time, this period is one year, part-time employees may take several years to complete induction.

References

Education in the United Kingdom
Teaching in the United Kingdom